Dignity is a Chilean-German thriller television series that first released on the German OTT streaming platform Joyn on December 19, 2019.

Plot
At the center of the story is the young state's attorney Leo Ramírez, who lives in Santiago and leads the investigation against Paul Schäfer at the request of judge Jiménez. The leader of the settlement of the German sect Colonia Dignidad, founded in Parral, is accused of obstruction of justice, kidnapping and child abuse.

The crime detective for sexual assault Pamela Rodríguez is the only one of few who supports Ramírez, since most of the residents of Parral, such as the criminal police chief Martínez, as well as political actors from Santiago, such as the Senator Ríos and the German ambassador Sattelberger, Schäfer's social support, such as the hospital, in which poor citizens of Parrals are treated free of charge or the boarding school, in which children from poorer families are given education, is highly recognized. Therefore, the investigation is difficult from several sides. This also includes Leo Ramírez's own life and family history.

For one, Leo Ramírez attended the boarding school with his brother Pedro and lived in the settlement. Schäfer also financed his law studies in Germany. On the other hand, he himself was sexually abused there, and his brother was killed or declared dead in the settlement in summer 1976. The dead turns out to be untrue. However, his wife Caro and crime detective Pamela Rodríguez initially don't know of Leo Ramírez's experiences in the settlement.

The investigation is also difficult because Schäfer is in hiding and the settlement doctor Bernard Hausmann and the assistant Schäfer's Ava cover him. Hausmann was arrested a short time later for falsifying documents and covering up a crime, but was get out shortly thereafter. Pamela Rodríguez made important evidence disappear as her family was threatened by Joel Carrillo, an assistant of Senator Ríos. Meanwhile, Anke Meier, the friend of Klaus alias Pedro Ramírez, tries to flee from the settlement.

The series takes place on two time domains: In the present, 1997, which deal with the investigation in Parral and Santiago, and in the past, 1976, which deal with the events at that time in the settlement.

Cast and characters

Main characters
The actors who play a leading role are listed below, sorted according to the names of the actors in the opening credits. In addition, the child actors of the main roles were added after the adult actors.

Recurring characters
In the following, actors are listed who play a recurring supporting role. Sorted by episode appearance.

Release

The first excerpts of Dignity were published already at the television trade fair MIPCOM in Cannes on October 14, 2019. Several leading actors were also present.

The first release took place two months later on December 19, 2019 on the German OTT streaming platform Joyn. However, it is only available in the paid area Joyn Plus+. Two new episodes were released weekly.

In Chile, the eight-part series is broadcast on Mega from November 14, 2020 at 3:30 a.m. weekly. In Latin America including Chile Amazon Prime Video published all eight episodes at the same time on November 13, 2020.

Episodes
On December 19, 2019, the first two episodes were released on Joyn in Germany. Two more episodes followed each week.

International broadcast 
 HBO Nordic (August 1, 2020)
 Denmark, Finland, Norway, Sweden: Dignity
 HBO Portugal (August 1, 2020)
 Portugal: Dignity 
 HBO España (August 1, 2020)
 Spain: Dignity 
 HBO Go (August 14, 2020)
 Bosnia and Herzegovina, Croatia, Montenegro, Serbia, Slovenia: Dostojanstvo 
 Bulgaria: Достойнство (romanized: Dostoynstvo) 
 Czech Republic, Slovakia: Kolonie Dignidad
 Hungary: Méltóság
 North Macedonia: Достоинство (romanized: Dostoinstvo)
 Poland: Godność
 Romania: Demnitate

Awards and nominations

References

External links

2010s Chilean television series
2019 German television series debuts
2019 Chilean television series debuts
German-language television shows
Spanish-language television shows
Television shows set in Santiago
Television shows filmed in Chile